Jahanshah Saleh (1905–1995) was an Iranian physician. He served as health minister and as an obstetrician of Queen Farah Diba, spouse of Shah Mohammad Reza Pahlavi.

Early life and education
Saleh was born in Kashan in 1905. He obtained a degree in obstetrics and gynecology from Columbia University, the US. He received further education at Syracuse University in the USA on gynecology. He graduated from the university in 1934 and returned to Iran.

Career
Saleh worked at the faculty of medicine in Tehran and was promoted to the title of associate professor. Later he became professor of gynecology. In 1936 he was appointed instructional head of the newly founded nursing school in Tehran. He headed the surgery department of women at Vaziri Hospital and also headed the midwifery school. He also worked at the Women's Hospital which was later renamed Jahanshah Saleh Hospital. In 1948 Saleh was appointed dean of the faculty of medicine at the University of Tehran.

Saleh was the health minister in the cabinet led by Haj Ali Razmara in the period 1950–1951. He replaced Mohammad Ali Varasteh in the post. Saleh remained in office in the next cabinet formed by Hossein Ala'. 

Saleh served as the obstetrician of Farah Pahlavi. He accompanied her during the birth of Prince Reza Cyrus Pahlavi in 1960. In 1966 Saleh was serving as the president of the University of Tehran.

Later years and death
Saleh was not only interested in medicine, but also in environmental protection. He was one of the Iranians who reported concerns over the quality of air in the cities. Initially his views were not taken into consideration, but in 1963 the Supreme Council of City Safety stated that air in the capital city, Tehran, was not healthy. Saleh died in Tehran in 1995.

References

External links

20th-century Iranian physicians
1905 births
1995 deaths
Chancellors of the University of Tehran
Health ministers
Iranian obstetricians and gynaecologists
Syracuse University alumni
Columbia University Vagelos College of Physicians and Surgeons alumni
Government ministers of Iran
People from Kashan